This is a list of awards and nominations for actress Rosario Dawson.

ALMA Awards

American Black Film Festival

BET Awards

Black Movie Awards

Black Reel Awards

Critics' Choice Movie Awards

Imagen Foundation Awards

NAACP Image Award

MTV Movie Awards

Online Film & Television Association Award

Satellite Awards

Saturn Awards

ShoWest Convention

Spike Video Game Awards

Streamy Awards

Sundance Film Festival

Teen Choice Awards

Women Film Critics Circle

References

Dawson, Rosario